Ilkeston Town F.C. was an English football club based in Ilkeston.

History
The club was formed in 1945 following the demise of clubs like Ilkeston United and a previous Ilkeston Town.

At first the club competed in local football, not joining the senior Midland League until 1961. They became Midland League champions in 1968 and spent two years in the Southern Football League in the early 1970s.

When the Midland League merged with the Yorkshire Football League to form the Northern Counties East League in 1982, Ilkeston became founder members of the new competition and entered the Premier Division. After finishing bottom of the league in 1986, they joined the Central Midlands League.

In 1990 they joined the West Midlands (Regional) League, and four years later they became champions, securing promotion back to the Southern League.

When the non-league pyramid was restructured in 2004, Town were placed in the Northern Premier League First Division, winning promotion to the Premier Division at the first attempt. Paul Hurst and former Rotherham United teammate Rob Scott were appointed joint managers of the Northern Premier League outfit in January 2009 following the departure of David Holdsworth to Mansfield Town. In May 2009 they won the league's play-off final to secure a place in the Conference North.

They finished 8th in their first season in the Conference North, but part way through their second season the club was liquidated due to an unpaid tax bill of £50,000.

A new club, Ilkeston F.C., was formed in its place.

Honours

League
Northern Premier League Premier Division
Promoted: 2008–09
Northern Premier League Division 1
Promoted: 2004–05
Southern League Midland Division
Promoted: 1994–95, 1997–98
Midland League
Champions: 1967–68
West Midlands (Regional) League Premier Division
Promoted: 1993–94 (champions)
West Midlands (Regional) League Division 1
Promoted: 1991–92 (as champions)

Cup
Derbyshire Senior Cup
Winners: 1949, 1953, 1956, 1958, 1963, 1983, 1993, 1999, 2000, 2006, 2007

Records
Best FA Cup performance: 2nd Round, 1997–98, 1999-00
Best FA Trophy performance: 3rd Round, Four occasions
Best FA Vase performance: 4th Round, 1988–89

References

Association football clubs established in 1945
1945 establishments in England
Association football clubs disestablished in 2010
2010 disestablishments in England
Defunct football clubs in Derbyshire
Ilkeston
 
Defunct football clubs in England
West Midlands (Regional) League
Southern Football League clubs
Northern Premier League clubs
National League (English football) clubs